Manoba implens is a moth in the family Nolidae. It was described by Francis Walker in 1863. It is found on Borneo, Peninsular Malaysia and the Philippines. The habitat consists of lowland and lower montane forests up to 1000 meters.

References

Moths described in 1863
Nolinae